Hilary Haag is an American voice actress who is known for her work for ADV Films and Sentai Filmworks. Haag has been involved in several lead roles in anime series, including Nene Romanova in Bubblegum Crisis Tokyo 2040, Teletha Testarossa in the Full Metal Panic series, Seth Nightroad in Trinity Blood, Rebecca Miyamoto in Pani Poni Dash!, Rosette Christopher in Chrono Crusade, and Chloe in Noir.

She attended Lamar Consolidated High School and later studied English Rhetoric at Texas A&M University. Haag resided in Los Angeles for almost 2 years after she graduated from Texas A&M University, but moved back to Houston where she grew up. Because of her distinctive natural child-like voice, she is often given the roles of younger female characters.

Filmography

Anime

Film

References

External links

American voice actresses
Living people
People from Baytown, Texas
Texas A&M University alumni
Actresses from Los Angeles
People from San Antonio
Actresses from Houston
21st-century American actresses
20th-century American actresses
People from College Station, Texas
People from Rosenberg, Texas
Year of birth missing (living people)